This is a list of cities and towns along the Susquehanna River and its branches in the United States, in the states of New York, Pennsylvania, and Maryland.  These communities and their surroundings are collectively referred to as the Susquehanna Valley.

Susquehanna River

West Branch Susquehanna River 

 
Susquehanna
Susquehanna
Susquehanna Valley